The Malta–Sicily interconnector is the submarine power cable which connects the power grid of Malta with the Italian Transmission Network managed by Terna, which is part of the European grid.

Technical characteristics
  From there it is connected to the Ragusa substation, which is of the Italian TSO Terna, via a  underground cable.

The cable and 132/220 kV substation in Malta is provided by Nexans. The cable has capacity of 200 MW and it uses 220 kV high voltage alternating current. The interconnector is operated by Enemalta, the Maltese power company.  In the 2014 the cable was laid in the sea by the ship C/S Nexans Skagerrak of the Company Nexans.  The interconnector became operational in March 2015.  The project cost €182 million.

Economic impact
The cable allows Malta to exchange electricity with the Italian power market, i.e. the island can both import and export electricity from Italy through the interconnector. 
The creation of this subsea cable ended Malta's previous electricity's isolation and diversified its mix of energy sources. In February 2015, European Commission underlined that Malta's interconnection level would go from 0% to approximately 35% with the new interconnector.

Problems
In December 2019 power outages in Malta were being caused by a failure of the interconnector cable having been damaged by a ship's anchor. In 2019 the interconnector supplied 23.1% of generated power.

Sites

See also 
 Energy in Malta
 Energy in Italy
 List of high voltage underground and submarine cables

References

External links
 Track of Malta–Sicily interconnector on Sicily

Electric power infrastructure in Malta
Electric power infrastructure in Italy
Italy–Malta relations
Naxxar
Ragusa, Sicily
High-voltage transmission lines
Energy infrastructure completed in 2015
2015 establishments in Italy
2015 establishments in Malta